Zeuzera biebingeri is a moth in the family Cossidae. It was described by Speidel and Speidel in 1986. It is found on Crete.

References

Natural History Museum Lepidoptera generic names catalog

Zeuzerinae
Moths described in 1986